Sanka  is a village in Chanditala II community development block of Srirampore subdivision in Hooghly district in the Indian state of West Bengal.

Geography
Chanditala police station serves this Village.

Gram panchayat
Villages and census towns in Kapasaria gram panchayat are: Kapashanria, Okardaha, Sahana, Sanka and Tisa.

Demographics
As per 2011 Census of India, Sanka had a total population of 1,265 of which 618 (49%) were males and 647 (51%) were females. Population below 6 years was 93. The total number of literates in Sanka was 968 (82.59% of the population over 6 years).

Transport

References 

Villages in Chanditala II CD Block